Bruno Gonçalves do Prado (born 24 February 1997), better known as just Brunão, is a Brazilian professional footballer who plays as a centre-back for Portuguese club Leixões.

Career
Brunão began his career with Vila Nova in Brazil. He made his professional debut with Vila Nova in a 1–0 Campeonato Brasileiro Série C win over Boa on 13 May 2017. He transferred to the Portuguese club Arouca in 2019, and promptly returned to Vila Nova on loan for the remainder of the season.

References

External links
 
 

1997 births
Living people
Sportspeople from Mato Grosso
Brazilian footballers
Vila Nova Futebol Clube players
F.C. Arouca players
Leixões S.C. players
Primeira Liga players
Liga Portugal 2 players
Campeonato Brasileiro Série B players
Campeonato Brasileiro Série C players
Association football defenders
Brazilian expatriate footballers
Brazilian expatriates in Portugal
Expatriate footballers in Portugal